Steluța Luca (née Lazăr, born 20 April 1975 in Pechea) is a former Romanian international handball player and current coach. She competed in the women's tournament at the 2000 Summer Olympics.

International honours 
EHF Champions League:
Finalist: 2010
Semifinalist: 2009
EHF Champions Trophy:
Winner: 2007
EHF Cup Winners' Cup:
Winner: 2007
Finalist: 2002
World Championship:
Silver Medallist: 2005
Fourth Place: 2007

Personal life
She is cousin with boxer Lucian Bute. Both of them were born in Pechea, Galați County.

References 

1975 births
Living people
People from Galați County
Romanian female handball players
Romanian handball coaches
Handball players at the 2000 Summer Olympics
Olympic handball players of Romania
Expatriate handball players
Romanian expatriates in Denmark
Romanian expatriates in Italy
SCM Râmnicu Vâlcea (handball) players
Expatriate sportspeople in Denmark
Expatriate sportspeople in Italy